Too Many Blondes  is a 1941 American musical comedy film directed by Thornton Freeland and starring Rudy Vallee, Helen Parrish and Lon Chaney Jr.

Plot

Cast

References

Bibliography
 Smith, Don G. Lon Chaney, Jr.: Horror Film Star, 1906-1973. McFarland, 2004.

External links
 

1941 films
1941 musical comedy films
American musical comedy films
Films directed by Thornton Freeland
Universal Pictures films
Films scored by Frank Skinner
American black-and-white films
1940s English-language films
1940s American films